Sophie May may refer to: 
Rebecca Sophia Clarke, author known as Sophie May
Sophie May (singer)

See also
Sophie May House